Qarabaldır (also, Karabaldyr) is a village and municipality in the Oghuz Rayon of Azerbaijan that has a population of 502.

References 

Populated places in Oghuz District